Ariel Behar and Andrey Golubev were the defending champions but chose not to defend their title.

Orlando Luz and Felipe Meligeni Alves won the title after defeating Antoine Hoang and Albano Olivetti 7–5, 6–7(6–8), [10–5] in the final.

Seeds

Draw

References

External links
 Main draw

Internazionali di Tennis Città di Trieste - Doubles